Where Evil Lies is a 1995 American erotic thriller film directed by Kevin Alber. It was part of the Roger Corman Presents series.

Cast
Nikki Fritz
Melissa Park
Emile Levisetti
Mark Kinsey Stephenson
Roma Court
Ingrid Sthare
Anna Lee

References

External links

Where Evil Lies at Letterbox DVD

1996 films
1990s English-language films
Films produced by Roger Corman
American thriller films
1990s thriller films
1990s American films